was a Japanese film actor and director. He appeared in more than two hundred films between 1925 and 1967.

Career
Saitō joined Nikkatsu studios, where he made his film debut in 1925, before moving to Shochiku two years later. He appeared in many films of Yasujirō Ozu between 1929 and 1950, and repeatedly worked for directors like Heinosuke Gosho and Hiroshi Shimizu. After the Second World War, he also directed a number of films and appeared in many television films and series.

Selected filmography

References

External links

1902 births
1968 deaths
People from Tokyo
Japanese male film actors
Japanese male silent film actors
20th-century Japanese male actors
Japanese film directors
Japanese male television actors